POP-11 is a reflective, incrementally compiled programming language with many of the features of an interpreted language. It is the core language of the Poplog programming environment developed originally by the University of Sussex, and recently in the School of Computer Science at the University of Birmingham, which hosts the main Poplog website.

POP-11 is an evolution of the language POP-2, developed in Edinburgh University, and features an open stack model (like Forth, among others). It is mainly procedural, but supports declarative language constructs, including a pattern matcher, and is mostly used for research and teaching in artificial intelligence, although it has features sufficient for many other classes of problems. It is often used to introduce symbolic programming techniques to programmers of more conventional languages like Pascal, who find POP syntax more familiar than that of Lisp. One of POP-11's features is that it supports first-class functions.

POP-11 is the core language of the Poplog system. The availability of the compiler and compiler subroutines at run-time (a requirement for incremental compilation) gives it the ability to support a far wider range of extensions (including run-time extensions, such as adding new data-types) than would be possible using only a macro facility. This made it possible for (optional) incremental compilers to be added for Prolog, Common Lisp and Standard ML, which could be added as required to support either mixed language development or development in the second language without using any POP-11 constructs. This made it possible for Poplog to be used by teachers, researchers, and developers who were interested in only one of the languages. The most successful product developed in POP-11 was the Clementine Data-mining system, developed by ISL. After SPSS bought ISL they decided to port Clementine to C++ and Java, and eventually succeeded with great effort (and perhaps some loss of the flexibility provided by the use of an AI language).

POP-11 was for a time available only as part of an expensive commercial package (Poplog), but since about 1999 it has been freely available as part of the Open Source version of Poplog, including various additional packages and teaching libraries. An online version of ELIZA using POP-11 is available at Birmingham.

At the University of Sussex, David Young used POP-11 in combination with C and Fortran to develop a suite of teaching and interactive development tools for image processing and vision, and has made them available in the Popvision extension to Poplog.

Simple code examples
Here is an example of a simple POP-11 program:

 define Double(Source) -> Result;
     Source*2 -> Result;
 enddefine;

 Double(123) =>

That prints out:
 ** 246

This one includes some list processing:

<nowiki>
 define RemoveElementsMatching(Element, Source) -> Result;
     lvars Index;
     [[%
     for Index in Source do
         unless Index = Element or Index matches Element then
             Index;
         endunless;
     endfor;
     %]] -> Result;
 enddefine;

 RemoveElementsMatching("the", [[the cat sat on the mat]]) => ;;; outputs [[cat sat on mat]]
 RemoveElementsMatching("the", [[the cat] [sat on] the mat]) => ;;; outputs [[the cat] [sat on] mat]
 RemoveElementsMatching([[= cat]], [[the cat]] is a [[big cat]]) => ;;; outputs [[is a]]
</nowiki>

Examples using the POP-11 pattern matcher, which makes it relatively easy for students to learn to develop sophisticated list-processing programs without having to treat patterns as tree structures accessed by 'head' and 'tail' functions (CAR and CDR in Lisp), can be found in the online introductory tutorial. The matcher is at the heart of
the SimAgent (sim_agent) toolkit. Some of the powerful features of the toolkit, such as linking pattern variables to inline code variables, would have been very difficult to implement without the incremental compiler facilities.

See also
 COWSEL (aka POP-1) programming language

References

 R. Burstall, A. Collins and R. Popplestone, Programming in Pop-2 University Press, Edinburgh, 1968
 D.J.M. Davies, POP-10 Users' Manual, Computer Science Report #25, University of Western Ontario, 1976
 S. Hardy and C. Mellish, 'Integrating Prolog in the Poplog environment', in Implementations of Prolog, Ed., J.A. Campbell, Wiley, New York, 1983, pp 147–162
 R. Barrett, A, Ramsay and A. Sloman, POP-11: a Practical Language for Artificial Intelligence, Ellis Horwood, Chicester, 1985
 M. Burton and N. Shadbolt, POP-11 Programming for Artificial Intelligence, Addison-Wesley, 1987
 J. Laventhol, Programming in POP-11, Blackwell Scientific Publications Ltd., 1987
 R. Barrett and A. Ramsay, Artificial Intelligence in Practice:Examples in Pop-11, Ellis Horwood, Chicester, 1987.
 M. Sharples et al., Computers and Thought, MIT Press, 1987. (An introduction to Cognitive Science using Pop-11. Online version referenced above.)
 James Anderson, Ed., Pop-11 Comes of Age: The Advancement of an AI Programming Language, Ellis Horwood, Chichester, 1989
 G. Gazdar and C. Mellish, Natural Language Processing in Pop11/Prolog/Lisp, Addison Wesley, 1989. (read online)
 R. Smith, A. Sloman and J. Gibson, POPLOG's two-level virtual machine support for interactive languages, in Research Directions in Cognitive Science Volume 5: Artificial Intelligence, Eds. D. Sleeman and N. Bernsen, Lawrence Erlbaum Associates, pp. 203–231, 1992. (Available as Cognitive Science Research Report 153, School of Informatics, University of Sussex).
 Chris Thornton and Benedict du Boulay, Artificial Intelligence Through Search, Kluwer Academic (Paperback version Intellect Books) Dordrecht Netherlands & Norwell, MA USA (Intellect at Oxford) 1992.
 A. Sloman, Pop-11 Primer, 1999 (Third edition)

External links
 Free Poplog Portal
 Information about POP-11 teaching materials
 The Poplog.org website (including partial mirror of Free poplog web site) (currently defunct: see its more recent copy (Jun 17, 2008) @ Internet Archive Wayback Machine)
 An Overview of POP-11 (Primer for experienced programmers) (alt. PDF)
 Waldek Hebisch produced a small collection of programming examples in Pop-11, showing how it can be used for symbol manipulation, numerical calculation, logic and mathematics.
 Computers and Thought: A practical Introduction to Artificial Intelligence on-line book introducing Cognitive Science through Pop-11.
 The OpenPoplog sourceforge project.
 The SimAgent (sim_agent) Toolkit
 Pop-11 Eliza in the poplog system. Tutorial on Eliza
 History of AI teaching in Pop-11 since about 1976.
 2-D (X) graphics in Pop-11
 Objectclass the object oriented programming extension to Pop-11 (modelled partly on CLOS and supporting multiple inheritance).
 Tutorial introduction to object oriented programming in Pop-11.
 Further references
 Online documentation on Pop-11 and Poplog
 Online system documentation, including porting information
 Entry for Pop-11 at HOPL (History of Programming Languages) web site

Lisp programming language family
Artificial intelligence
History of computing in the United Kingdom
Science and technology in East Sussex
University of Sussex